It Looked Like Spilt Milk is an American children's picture book, written and illustrated by Charles Green Shaw. Originally published in 1947, the illustrations are a series of changing white shapes against a blue background. The reader is asked to guess what the shape is or whether it is just "spilt milk". The white shapes include a rabbit, a bird, a pig, a sheep, a birthday cake, a tree, an ice cream cone, a flower, an angel, a squirrel, a mitten, and a great horned owl. At the end of the book, the shape reads the same thing as the first page ("Sometimes it looked like spilt milk. But it wasn't spilt milk".). It wasn't really spilt milk but only a cloud in the sky. Then the silhouette shape becomes a real cloud in the sky revealing that it was just a cloud. Then the changing white silhouette turns into a real cloud and the cloud goes up into the blue sky (which is what the last page really becomes). It becomes the blue sky and the white silhouette shape which turned into a cloud. 

A Scholastic Corporation edition was published in 1989. A board book version was published in 1993. An audio cassette and compact disc version by Live Oak Media was published in 1988 and has the narration of Peter Fernandez with the music heard at the beginning and end and read without music.

Reception
Kirkus Reviews wrote "Children love to play this game from earliest identification, and will like a book that plays it with them. Blue and white silhouettes make a cute idea book."

References

Bader, Barbara, (1976) American Picturebooks from Noah's Ark to the Beast Within, Macmillan p. 527. 
Fredericks, Anthony D. (1993) Involving Parents Through Children's Literature: Preschool-Kindergarten, Libraries Unlimited, p. 27. 
Silvey, Anita (1995) Children's Books and Their Creators, Houghton Mifflin Harcourt, p. 597. 

1947 children's books
Harper & Row books
American picture books